Vincent Moore (born 25 February 1994) is a South African first class cricketer. He was included in the Easterns cricket team squad for the 2015 Africa T20 Cup.

References

External links
 

1994 births
Living people
South African cricketers
Easterns cricketers
Place of birth missing (living people)